Lolwah Rashid Mohammed Al-Khater (Arabic: لؤلؤة الخاطر) (born in Doha, Qatar) is a Qatari diplomat who is the first Qatari woman to hold the position of Spokesperson for the Qatari Ministry of Foreign Affairs and Assistant Foreign Minister of Qatar.

Career
Lolwah Al-Khater holds a master's of science in computing and initially worked as an engineer in the field of oil and gas. She pursued a master's of arts in public policy, with a focus on public policy and Islam. According to her biography, she is a part-time lecturer at the Doha Institute for Graduate Studies and a research associate at The Oxford Gulf and Arabian Peninsula Forum at St Antony's College at the University of Oxford. According to her biography, she is a DPhil Candidate at the University of Oxford in the area of Oriental Studies, examining Islam and Modernity in the context of the Arab Nahda.

Al-Khater entered the Qatari ministry of foreign affairs as a minister plenipotentiary. She was Director of Planning and Quality at Qatar Tourism Authority and a Research Project Manager at Qatar Foundation for Education, Science and Community Development. In 2017, Al-Khater was appointed the Spokesperson of the Ministry of Foreign Affairs by Mohammed bin Abdulrahman Al Thani, the first woman to hold this post. This appointment has been cited as an important advance in women's representation in the Qatari government. In this role, she was "one of the most prominent voices" advocating for Qatar during the 2017 Qatar diplomatic crisis, according to Al Khaleej, and pushed for "a meaningful solution" to the Syrian civil war. In 2019, she was appointed Assistant Minister of Foreign Affairs by Emir Tamim bin Hamad Al Thani.

She is Spokesperson for the Supreme Committee for Crisis Management in Qatar. In this role, she delivered daily briefings to the public on Qatar TV during the COVID-19 pandemic.

She is a member of the Advisory Board of the Georgetown University in Qatar.

Writings

See also
 Alya bint Ahmed Al Thani

References

External links 

 
 Ministerial website of 
FRANCE 24 meets Lulwa Rashid Al-Khater, Qatar's foreign ministry spokeswoman
Diplomat: Qatar's strategic choice has always been 'Gulf reconciliation'
H.E. Lolwah Al Khater: MOFA Qatar's spokesperson and assistant to deputy foreign minister

Alumni of Imperial College London
Qatari women diplomats
Qatari writers
Qatari women
Qatari women writers
Foreign relations of Qatar
21st-century women politicians
Qatari women in politics
Hamad Bin Khalifa University alumni
Year of birth missing (living people)
Living people
People from Doha
Qatari Muslims